Sussi or susi (Soosey, Sousae)  was a term for multicolored striped or checked cloth produced in the Indian subcontinent. Sussi was thin handloom fabric made of cotton, silk, or a blend of the two, with colored warp stripes. Punjab region was known for its production and exports during the Mughal period. Sussi was most often made with red and blue, blue and white, or green and white stripes, but other patterns were also produced. The fabric was exported to England, where sousaes were in great demand in the 18th century.

Name 
Sussi was the umbrella term used for all striped fabrics.

Texture 
Sussi was plain fabric with warp vertical stripes. Sussi was produced with cotton, with silk, or with blended cotton and silk.

Dimensions 
The fabric was 10 to 20 yards long and one yard in width.

Sussi Types and Production 
Sussi along with other cotton varieties was produced at Hoshiarpur, Gurdaspur, Peshawar, Lahore, Multan, Amritsar, Ludhiana, Jhang, Shahpur, Jalandhar, Delhi, Gurgaon, Rohtak, Karnal, Rewari, Panipat and in Sindh. Salari was a type of handloom-produced sussi made at Kalabagh in Mianwali District, Pakistan.

Use 
The cloth was used to make lowers such as pajamas and salwars (loose trousers). Blended sussi was used for pajamas and petticoats.

See also 
 Bayadere (fabric)
 Gingham
 Madras (cloth)
 Salu (cloth)
 Tartan
 Tapsel (cloth)

References 

Woven fabrics
Patterns
Textile arts of India
Textile arts of Pakistan
Cotton